Novy Byt is a rural locality (a settlement) and the administrative center of Volosatovskoye Rural Settlement, Selivanovsky District, Vladimir Oblast, Russia. The population was 1,047 as of 2010. There are 17 streets.

Geography 
Novy Byt is located 18 km northwest of Krasnaya Gorbatka (the district's administrative centre) by road. Lukoyanikha is the nearest rural locality.

References 

Rural localities in Selivanovsky District